William George Juergens (September 7, 1904 – December 7, 1988) was an American attorney and jurist who served as a United States district judge of the United States District Court for the Eastern District of Illinois and the United States District Court for the Southern District of Illinois.

Early life and education

Born in Steeleville, Illinois, Juergens received an Artium Baccalaureus degree from Carthage College in 1925 and a Juris Doctor from the University of Michigan Law School in 1928.

Career 
He was in private practice in Chester, Illinois from 1928 to 1938, also serving as a city attorney of Chester from 1930 to 1938. He was a county judge of Randolph County, Illinois from 1938 to 1950, and a Circuit Judge of the Third Judicial Circuit of Illinois from 1951 to 1956.

Federal judicial service

Juergens was nominated by President Dwight D. Eisenhower on June 7, 1956, to a seat on the United States District Court for the Eastern District of Illinois vacated by Judge Fred Louis Wham. He was confirmed by the United States Senate on June 21, 1956, and received his commission the next day. He served as Chief Judge from 1965 to 1972. He assumed senior status on April 26, 1972. Juergens was reassigned by operation of law to the United States District Court for the Southern District of Illinois on March 31, 1979, under the provisions of 92 Stat. 883.

Death 
Juergens died on December 7, 1988.

References

Sources
 

1904 births
1988 deaths
People from Randolph County, Illinois
Illinois state court judges
Judges of the United States District Court for the Eastern District of Illinois
Judges of the United States District Court for the Southern District of Illinois
United States district court judges appointed by Dwight D. Eisenhower
20th-century American judges
Carthage College alumni
University of Michigan Law School alumni